Philipp Plank (born 11 June 1995) is an Austrian footballer currently playing as a midfielder for Kapfenberger SV of the Erste Liga.

Career statistics

Club

Notes

|2019 ISL

References

1995 births
Living people
Austrian footballers
Austria youth international footballers
Association football midfielders
2. Liga (Austria) players
SK Rapid Wien players
SC Ritzing players
Kapfenberger SV players
People from Scheibbs District
Austrian Regionalliga players
Footballers from Lower Austria